Elm Ridge Plantation, also known as the Hatch House and Holbrook House, is a historic forced-labor farm and plantation house in rural  Hale County near Greensboro, Alabama.  The one-story raised cottage-style house was built about 1836.  It was added to the Alabama Register of Landmarks and Heritage on November 2, 1990, and to the National Register of Historic Places on October 11, 1991, due to its architectural significance.

Its  property includes five contributing buildings and one other contributing structure.

References

National Register of Historic Places in Hale County, Alabama
Houses on the National Register of Historic Places in Alabama
Houses completed in 1836
Properties on the Alabama Register of Landmarks and Heritage
Houses in Hale County, Alabama
Mid 19th Century Revival architecture
Plantation houses in Alabama
Plantations in Alabama